Yinon Barda (born 2 October 1984) is an Israeli of a Tunisian-Jewish descent footballer, currently playing for F.C. Dimona.

External links
Profile at One
Stats at IFA

1984 births
Living people
Jewish Israeli sportspeople
Israeli footballers
Hapoel Be'er Sheva F.C. players
F.C. Ashdod players
Hapoel Bnei Lod F.C. players
Hapoel Ashkelon F.C. players
Maccabi Be'er Sheva F.C. players
Hapoel Rishon LeZion F.C. players
Maccabi Herzliya F.C. players
Maccabi Kiryat Gat F.C. players
F.C. Dimona players
Israeli Premier League players
Liga Leumit players
Footballers from Beersheba
Israeli people of Tunisian-Jewish descent
Association football forwards